The Leukemia & Lymphoma Society (LLS), a 501(c)(3) charitable organization founded in 1949, is the largest voluntary health organization dedicated to fighting blood cancer in the world. The LLS's mission is to cure leukemia, lymphoma, Hodgkin's lymphoma and myeloma, and improve the quality of life of patients and their families.

LLS is headquartered in Rye Brook, New York, with 56 chapters throughout the United States and five chapters in Canada. LLS has six signature fundraising campaigns: Team In Training, the largest charitable endurance training program in the world; Light The Night, an annual series of community-based walkathons; Man & Woman of the Year, a series of annual ten-week long, community-based competitions in which adults raise funds in honour of local children who have survived blood cancer; Students of the Year, an annual series of seven-week long, community-based fundraising competitions amongst high school students; Leukemia Cup Regatta, a series of fundraising sailing events held by yacht clubs across North America; and Pennies for Patients, a programme providing North American elementary and middle schools with access to STEM curricula. In addition to the main campaigns, there is LLS Lifestyle, in which groups and individuals, through their local chapters, can turn any activity or event into a vehicle for fundraising.

History 
Originally known as the Robert Roesler de Villiers Foundation, The Leukemia & Lymphoma Society was founded in New York City in 1949 by Rudolph and Antoinette de Villiers after the death of their son Robert from leukemia. The name of the organization was later changed to the Leukemia Society, then to the Leukemia Society of America in the 1960s, and later to The Leukemia & Lymphoma Society in 2000 to reflect the organization's focus on all types of blood cancer.

Research 
Since its founding, The Leukemia & Lymphoma Society has invested more than $1.2 billion (USD) in blood cancer research, funding nearly all of today's most promising treatments. As there are no means of preventing blood cancers, the LLS research agenda is focused on finding treatments and cures. The organization funds research in areas of unmet medical need and helps to bridge the gap between academic discovery and drug development.

Acute leukemia

Acute myeloid leukemia 
Acute myeloid leukemia (AML) is a rapidly progressing disease that remains one of the most deadly blood cancers, killing more than 10,000 Americans a year. Despite advances in treating other blood cancers, the standard of treatment for AML – a combination of toxic chemotherapies – had changed little over the past four decades. In October 2016, LLS launched its Beat AML Master Clinical Trial, a collaborative precision medicine clinical trial that gives patients targeted therapies based on their genetic markers.

LLS is leading the Beat AML Master Clinical Trial  and is the first nonprofit cancer organization to sponsor a clinical trial. The trial consists of a collaboration among multiple leading cancer centres and pharmaceutical companies, a clinical research organization, and a genomics analysis company. The protocol for the trial was developed with input from the U.S. Food and Drug Administration (FDA). The Beat AML Master Clinical Trial is expected to eventually include 500 patients and will continue for at least two years at between 15 and 20 clinical sites.

Acute lymphoblastic leukemia 
 towards research into immunotherapies targeting acute lymphoblastic leukemia (ALL). As part of a wider funding effort including over a dozen other cancer immunotherapy projects, they hope to support more effective and targeted treatments utilizing the human body's own internal attack mechanisms.

In late 2017, LLS awarded researchers at UNC School of Medicine a $600 thousand grant for clinical research on chimeric antigen receptor (CAR) T cell therapies with an immunosuppressive "safety switch". This approach could mitigate potentially lethal side effects of immunotherapy—such as cytokine release syndrome—for ALL treatments by halting the activity of infused T cells, in the event of a patient experiencing treatment toxicity.

Patient support
The Leukemia & Lymphoma Society is a source of blood cancer information, education and support for patients, survivors, families and healthcare professionals.

In 1997, LLS created the Information Resource Center (IRC) to provide blood cancer patients, their families and health professionals with accurate, current disease information, resources and support. LLS Blood Cancer Information Specialists are master's level oncology social workers, nurses and health educators. An Information Specialist can assist patients through cancer treatment, financial and social challenges and give accurate, up-to-date disease, treatment and support information.

As a community-based voluntary health organization, LLS has regional and local chapters throughout the United States and Canada to support blood cancer patients in every community.

Advocacy 
The Leukemia & Lymphoma Society's Office of Public Policy pursues LLS's mission through advocacy aimed at governmental decision-makers.

Through LLS's nationwide grassroots network of more than 100,000 volunteers, the organization advocates for policies at the state and federal level to remove barriers to care for blood cancer patients. These efforts include helping to increase federal research funds, speed the review and approval process of new therapies, and ensure patients are able to access their treatments.

LLS also advocates for public policy positions that accelerate progress toward cures for leukemia, Hodgkin and non-Hodgkin lymphoma and myeloma, and to improve the quality of life of those with blood cancer, their friends and families.

Fundraising

Light the Night Walk

The Light the Night Walk is the Leukemia & Lymphoma Society's walk to build awareness of blood cancers as well as raise money for research and support of patients and their families. It is held in over 200 communities in North America each fall as well as almost 100 in Australia.

Walkers carry illuminated lanterns of different colors. White balloons are carried by survivors, red by supporters, and gold balloons are carried by those walking in memory of a loved one they lost. In Australia, gold balloons are used in memory of a loved one, and the color blue is used to show support. Children, adults, and seniors all take part in the annual evening walk. The walkers all enjoy a leisurely pace, as there are no fitness requirements to participate. Usually, it is completed in under an hour. In some walks (Australia), a short route as well as an optional extended route is available.

Funds raised by participants support the Society's mission: cure leukemia, lymphoma, Hodgkin's lymphoma and myeloma, and improve the quality of life of patients and their families. Walkers who raise a minimum of $100 become a Champion for Cures and are honored with a Light the Night t-shirt, balloon, and wristband for food and refreshments at the walk.

The 2011 celebrity ambassador for the walk was Michael C. Hall. At 38 years old, he was diagnosed with Hodgkin's lymphoma. Past national spokespeople include Tina Fey in 2009 and Cynthia Nixon in 2007.

References 

Charities based in New York (state)
Cancer charities in the United States
Leukemia
Medical and health organizations based in New York (state)
Voluntary health agencies of the United States